Kenneth Ray Williams (born June 9, 1969) is an American former professional basketball player, most notably with the National Basketball Association's Indiana Pacers. He was known for his stellar leaping ability and off-court problems.

Biography
Williams, a 6' 9" forward, was a prep sensation at Elizabeth City (N.C.) Northeastern High School. His sophomore year, he averaged over 20 points and 12 rebounds a game. He played in the Hampton Roads Basketball Classic in Norfolk, scoring 42 points, and winning the MVP award over the likes of Alonzo Mourning, JR Reid, and Dennis Scott. He was named first team AP All-State. Prior to his junior year, he transferred to Fork Union Military Academy in Virginia, where he averaged 17 points and 12 rebounds for a 29-0 team. In his senior year, he averaged 31 points per game and 12 rebounds a game, and was named state player of the year for North Carolina in 1988. Williams was named first-team USA Today (over such players as Shawn Kemp and Stanley Roberts) and first-team Parade All-American. Williams was selected to play in the McDonald's Game and the Capital Classic, though he only played in the Classic, scoring eight points. In addition, he played two scrimmages against Mourning, and more than held his own, scoring 41 points in the first scrimmage and outrebounding Alonzo in both scrimmages.

Williams was one of the top four players in the class of 1988, along with Alonzo Mourning, Billy Owens and Kemp. He was heavily recruited by the University of North Carolina, but was not offered a scholarship because of his failure to meet the minimum academic standards. His commitment with UNC scared off some top recruits, among them Billy Owens. He instead enrolled at Barton County Community College in Barton County, Kansas (20.5 points and 8.9 rebounds per game).

In 1989-90, Williams attended Elizabeth City State University, where he did not play basketball. He was subsequently selected in the second round of the 1990 NBA Draft by the Indiana Pacers (46th overall pick).

Williams played four seasons for the Pacers, from 1990–1994 and had a career high 6.3 points per game while playing in 68 games in 1993-94. He scored a career high 25 points in a Pacers win against the Miami Heat on February 9, 1994. For his career he averaged 4.8 points and 2.7 rebounds in 260 total games. He was also a contestant in the 1991 NBA Slam Dunk Contest but failed to advance into the second round.

Following his NBA career, Williams went to Europe and played in several countries, mainly in Israel: ASVEL Villeurbanne (1995–96), Forli (1996–97), Hapoel Jerusalem (1997-2000, 2001, being runner-up twice in the national cup and once in the league), Troy Pilsener Izmir (2000, returning to Hapoel shortly after), Bnei Herzeliya (2001–02), Maccabi Ironi Ramat Gan (2003–04), Hapoel Tel Aviv (2004–05, again losing in the league final) and Maccabi Giv'at Shmuel (2005–06).

References

External links
NBA stats @ databasebasketball.com
College stats at Sportsstats.com

1969 births
Living people
African-American basketball players
American expatriate basketball people in France
American expatriate basketball people in Israel
American expatriate basketball people in Italy
American men's basketball players
ASVEL Basket players
Barton Cougars men's basketball players
Basketball players from North Carolina
Bnei Hertzeliya basketball players
Elizabeth City State University alumni
Hapoel Jerusalem B.C. players
Hapoel Tel Aviv B.C. players
Indiana Pacers draft picks
Indiana Pacers players
Ironi Ramat Gan players
Israeli Basketball Premier League players
Maccabi Givat Shmuel players
McDonald's High School All-Americans
Parade High School All-Americans (boys' basketball)
Power forwards (basketball)
Small forwards
People from Elizabeth City, North Carolina
21st-century African-American people
20th-century African-American sportspeople